The 1949–50 Ohio Bobcats men's basketball team represented Ohio University in the college basketball season of 1949–50. The team was coached by Jim Snyder in his 1st of 26 seasons as Ohio's head coach.  They played their home games at the Men's Gymnasium. They finished the season 6–14.  They finished fourth in the Mid-American Conference with a conference record of 3–7.

Schedule

|-
!colspan=9 style=| Regular Season

 Source:

Statistics

Team Statistics
Final 1949–50 Statistics

Source

Player statistics

Source

References

Ohio Bobcats men's basketball seasons
Ohio
1949 in sports in Ohio
1950 in sports in Ohio